"Number One Blind" is a song by Veruca Salt. It was released previously on the album American Thighs.

Background
It was written by Nina Gordon. The song references the window blind manufacturer Levolor in the chorus. The music video for the song was directed by Steve Hanft, but the band was unhappy with the result and pulled it from MTV circulation.

Track listing
"Number One Blind" (Gordon/Shapiro) – 3:45
"Bodies" (Cover of Bodies by the Sex Pistols) (Cook/Jones/Vicious/Rotten) – 4:10
"Aurora" (Gordon) – 4:06

Personnel 

Nina Gordon  -  Guitar, Vocals
Steve Lack  -  Bass
Louise Post  -  Guitar, Vocals
Jim Shapiro  -  drums, Vocals (background)
Brad Wood  -  Engineer
Doug McBride - Engineer

References

1994 songs
1995 singles
Veruca Salt songs
Songs written by Nina Gordon